Judit Horváth Pálfi (born 1968) is a Hungarian retired wheelchair fencer who competed at international fencing competitions. She is a four-time Paralympic silver medalist.

In 1991, Pálfi was involved in a car accident, she had a lower back injury which resulted in paralysis. She started out wheelchair fencing a year later and entered the 1996 Summer Paralympics as a wildcard.

References

1968 births
Living people
Hungarian female fencers
Hungarian female épée fencers
Hungarian female foil fencers
Paralympic wheelchair fencers of Hungary
Wheelchair fencers at the 1996 Summer Paralympics
Wheelchair fencers at the 2000 Summer Paralympics
Wheelchair fencers at the 2004 Summer Paralympics
Wheelchair fencers at the 2008 Summer Paralympics
Wheelchair fencers at the 2012 Summer Paralympics
Medalists at the 1996 Summer Paralympics
Medalists at the 2000 Summer Paralympics
Medalists at the 2004 Summer Paralympics
20th-century Hungarian women